The Michigan–Michigan State women's basketball rivalry is a college basketball rivalry between the Michigan Wolverines and Michigan State Spartans women's basketball programs that is part of the larger intrastate rivalry between the University of Michigan and Michigan State University. The rivalry between the Wolverines and Spartans notably includes football, ice hockey, and men's basketball, but extends to almost all sports.

History
As of January 2023, Michigan State leads the series 73–24, including winning 24 of the first 27 meetings between the two teams. With both teams being in the Big Ten Conference, the teams have met at least once a year since 1973. In February 2020, Michigan completed its first season sweep of the Spartans since the 2014–15 season.

Accomplishments by the two rivals
The following summarizes the accomplishments of the two programs.

Game results

All-time meetings

References

College basketball rivalries in the United States
Big Ten Conference rivalries
Michigan Wolverines women's basketball
Michigan State Spartans women's basketball